Rhipha chionoplaga is a moth in the family Erebidae. It was described by Paul Dognin in 1913. It is found in Panama.

References

Natural History Museum Lepidoptera generic names catalog

Moths described in 1913
Phaegopterina